The Ship is a public house in New Cavendish Street, London. The 19th century building is grade II listed.

References

External links 

Grade II listed pubs in the City of Westminster